Luc Roosen (born 17 September 1964, in Bree) is a retired road racing cyclist from Belgium, who was a professional rider from 1986 to 1997.

Career achievements
He competed in six Tours de France, as well as one edition each of the Giro d'Italia and Vuelta a España. He also finished in second place in the 1990 Amstel Gold Race. Roosen obtained a total of sixteen victories during his professional career, including the 1991 Tour de Suisse.

Major results

1986
 8th Overall Critérium du Dauphiné Libéré
1st Stage 4b
 8th Overall Tour of Belgium
1987
 1st Stage 6a Grand Prix du Midi Libre
 3rd GP Stad Zottegem
 7th Grand Prix de Fourmies
1988
 1st Tour du Haut Var
 1st Stage 5 Tour de Suisse
 2nd Druivenkoers-Overijse
 2nd Overall Vuelta a Aragón
 3rd Milano–Torino
 4th Giro di Lombardia
 4th Grand Prix de Wallonie
 5th Züri-Metzgete
 6th Liège–Bastogne–Liège
1989
 2nd Overall Vuelta a Andalucía
1st Stage 4
 2nd Overall Tour Méditerranéen
1st Stage 4a
 3rd Tour du Haut Var
 3rd Giro di Lombardia
 4th Rund um den Henninger Turm
 9th Overall Paris–Nice
 10th La Flèche Wallonne
1990
 1st Trophée des Grimpeurs
 1st Stage 3 Tour de Suisse
 1st Stage 7 Critérium du Dauphiné Libéré
 2nd Amstel Gold Race
 2nd Trofeo Luis Puig
 3rd Overall Tour de Romandie
 5th Liège–Bastogne–Liège
 6th Overall Vuelta a Andalucía
 10th Overall Tirreno–Adriatico
1991
 1st  Overall Tour de Suisse
1st Stage 2
 1st Stage 3a Tour Méditerranéen
 3rd Overall Tour du Vaucluse
1st Stage 4
 9th Züri-Metzgete
1992
 3rd Giro del Friuli
 5th Amstel Gold Race
 7th La Flèche Wallonne
 8th Grand Prix des Amériques
 9th Road race, UCI Road World Championships
 10th Wincanton Classic
1993
 10th Overall Tour Méditerranéen
1994
 2nd Overall Vuelta a Andalucía
1995
 2nd Overall Niederösterreich Rundfahrt
 3rd Gent–Wevelgem
 6th Overall West Virginia Classic
 9th Trofeo Laigueglia
1996
 2nd Overall Tour of Austria
1st Stage 9
1997
 4th De Brabantse Pijl
 9th Grand Prix de Wallonie

Grand Tour general classification results timeline

References

 

1964 births
Living people
Belgian male cyclists
Sportspeople from Ghent
Cyclists from East Flanders
Tour de Suisse stage winners